Xingfu, meaning "happy" in Chinese, especially the happy in a family, is used in many place names in China:

Xingfu Community
Xingfu, Zhucheng, in Zhucheng Subdistrict, Xinzhou District, Wuhan, Hubei
Xingfu Subdistrict
Xingfu Subdistrict, Qiqihar, Heilongjiang
Xingfu Subdistrict, Baicheng, Jilin
Xingfu Subdistrict, Nantong, Jiangsu
Xingfu Subdistrict, Suqian, Jiangsu
Xingfu Subdistrict, Nanchang, Jiangxi
Xingfu Town
Xingfu, Harbin, in Xiangfang District, Harbin, Heilongjiang
Xingfu, Dujiangyan, Sichuan
Xingfu Town, Yunnan, in Yun County
Xingfu Township
Xingfu Township, Anhui, in Langxi County
Xingfu Township, Heihe, Heilongjiang
Xingfu Township, Huanan County, Heilongjiang
Xingfu Township, Hunan, in Huarong County
Xingfu Township, Inner Mongolia, in Taibus Banner, Xilin Gol League
Xingfu Township, Jiangsu, in Gangzha District, Nantong
Xingfu Township, Changchun, Jilin
Xingfu Township, Taonan, Jilin
Xingfu Township, Ningnan County, Sichuan
Xingfu Township, Santai County, Sichuan
Xingfu Township, Yunnan, in Yun County

See also
Xinfu (disambiguation)